Vantha Rajavathaan Varuven is a Tamil-language action comedy film directed by Sundar C. and produced by Lyca Productions. A remake of the Telugu film Attarintiki Daredi (2013), the film stars Silambarasan, Ramya Krishnan, Prabhu, Nassar, Megha Akash, and Catherine Tresa, with Mahat Raghavendra and Yogi Babu, among others, in supporting roles. Hiphop Tamizha composes the film's music. The title of the film is taken from a famous dialogue by Silambarasan in the film Chekka Chivantha Vaanam (2018).

Plot 
Raghunandhan is a rich but unhappy businessman based in Madrid. He wishes to reconcile with his estranged daughter Nandhini, whom he expelled because she married Prakash against his wishes. His grandson Aadhi promises Raghunandan that he will bring her back to their home on his 80th birthday. Nandhini has two daughters: Maya and Priya. Aadhi enters the house as a driver named Raja who was appointed by Prakash after saving him from a heart attack. Raja tries to woo Priya but gives up when he learns that she is in love with another man. Maya hates Raja and is suspicious of him. Nandhini later reveals to Raja that she is aware of his real identity much before the incidents and warns him to abstain from doing anything with the intention of taking her back to Raghunandan.

To save Priya's love, Raja and Bucket, Nandhini and Prakash's manager, go to a village, and accidentally, Maya falls into the jeep due to a head injury, thus suffering with amnesia. Raja introduces himself as her lover for the time being. Maya believes it. The trio goes to the venue. Raja and Bucket enter the house. They and the bridegroom escape from there and reach Nandhini's home after a violent altercation with the family members of the bridegroom where Maya's memory is revived. The bride's father Pandithurai asks for compensation for the damage caused by Raja, to which Nandhini promises Maya's marriage with Pandithurai's second son Saravanan. To avoid complications, Prakash fires Raja. Raja later learns that Maya loved him from the beginning but was hesitant to express her feelings.

Azhagu, Pandithurai’s eldest son, falls for Maya, but his attempts are repeatedly thwarted by Raja. On the day of her marriage, Maya elopes with Raja. While waiting with him for the train to Coimbatore, Pandithurai's men reach the station to stop them, only to be trashed by Raja and his assistants, led by Roshan. Through Roshan, Maya discovers Raja’s real motive. An angry Prakash, with Nandhini, arrives to shoot Raja, but Prakash is taken aback after knowing his true identity as Aadhi. Aadhi reveals that the day Nandhini left the house, Raghunandan tried to commit suicide but accidentally killed Aadhi’s mother. He says that he chose to love his grandfather, though he killed his mother. Nandhini chose to hate him, as he injured Prakash and expelled them.

Nandhini and Prakash realise their folly and reconcile with Aadhi. Maya is kidnapped by four henchmen appointed by Azhagu, where she narrates the story to the henchmen. Aadhi and Bucket reach the spot, and Maya reconciles with Raja. Pandithurai is arrested. Raghunandan reconciles with Nandhini, and Aadhi is unanimously appointed as the CEO of the company thanks to Raghunandan and Nandhini's support. The film ends with Aadhi holding Raghunandan's hand with affection.

Cast 

 Silambarasan as Adithya "Adhi" (Raja)
 Ramya Krishnan as Nandhini 
 Nassar as Raghunandhan
 Prabhu as Prakash
 Megha Akash as Maya 
 Catherine Tresa as Priya
 Mahat Raghavendra as Rohith
 Radha Ravi as Pandithurai
 Suman as Aadhithya's father
 Surekha Vani as Sumathi, Aadhithya's mother
 Yogi Babu as Azhagu, Pandithurai's first son
 Robo Shankar as Bucket, Nandhini and Prakash's manager
 VTV Ganesh as Roshan, Aadhithya's assistant
 Rajendran as Loan Collector
 Vamsi Krishna as Praveen
 Lokesh Bhaskaran as Saravanan, Pandithurai's second son
 Amit Tiwari as Pandithurai's third son
 Abhishek Shankar as Prakash's brother 
 Gowtham Sundararajan as Prakash's brother  
 Vichu Vishwanath as Aadhithya's assistant
 Aryan as ACP                 
 Raj Kapoor as Minister
 Thalapathy Dinesh as Pandithurai's henchman
 Singamuthu as Waiter
 Mohan Raman as Audi car owner
 Sai Madhavi as Prakash's sister-in-law
 Japan Kumar as Kidnapper
 KPY Ramar as Kidnapper
 Tiger Garden Thangadurai as Kidnapper
 Gajaraj as Aadhithya Company's shareholder
 Robert in a special appearance in the song "Red Cardu"

Production 
Shooting began in September 2018 at Georgia.

Music 
Hiphop Tamizha scored the film's soundtrack for Sundar C the fourth time, while collaborating for the first time with Silambarasan.  The song Vaanga Machan Vaanga is a remix of the song of the same name from the yesteryear film, Madurai Veeran.The song modern muniyamma was a re-used song by Hiphop Thamizha From the Film Krishnarjuna Yudham Release Vantha Rajavathaan Varuven was released on 1 February 2019..

 Home Media 
The Satellite Rights was acquired by Zee Tamil and Digital Rights was acquired by Zee5

 Reception 
The film received mostly negative reviews from audience and critics .

 Critical response 
S Subhakeerthana of The Indian Express gave the film a rating of 1.5 stars out of 5, citing "The core purpose of any ‘entertainer’ is to ‘entertain’ you. But this Sundar C film doesn’t.". Sify'' gave the film 2.5 stars out of 5, stating "Watch it if you are a fan of STR!"

Box office 
The film earned  in Tamil Nadu on its opening day.

References

External links 
 

2019 comedy-drama films
2010s masala films
Tamil remakes of Telugu films
Films directed by Sundar C.
Films scored by Hiphop Tamizha
2010s Tamil-language films
Indian comedy-drama films
Films shot in Georgia (U.S. state)
2019 films